Paul B. Meloan (August 23, 1888 – February 11, 1950) was an American Major League Baseball right fielder with the Chicago White Sox and St. Louis Browns. 'Molly', as his teammates dubbed him, batted left-handed and threw right-handed.

References

External links

1888 births
1950 deaths
Major League Baseball outfielders
Chicago White Sox players
St. Louis Browns players
Baseball players from Missouri
People from Pike County, Missouri
Jacksonville Lunatics players
Rock Island Islanders players
Springfield Senators players
Toledo Mud Hens players
Washington University Bears baseball players
Louisville Colonels (minor league) players
Venice Tigers players
San Francisco Seals (baseball) players
Des Moines Boosters players
Wichita Jobbers players
Sioux City Indians players